Penicillium fennelliae is an anamorph species of the genus of Penicillium which produces patulin, orsellinic acid and penicillinic acid.

See also
 List of Penicillium species

References

fennelliae
Fungi described in 1969